Telelift GmbH is a worldwide operating German engineering company which develops and installs advanced logistics systems (Monorail conveyor) for hospitals, libraries, industry and security-related applications. The systems provide a comprehensive transport automation of light materials handling and have no limits in number of operator stations for both sending, and receiving of goods, in closed and locked container vehicles.

Telelift has headquarters in Maisach, near Munich in Germany and three subsidiaries in Berlin, Stuttgart and Singapore.

History 
Telelift was founded in 1964 in Munich. In the same year, the first of numerous patents was granted for an electric track vehicle system. Which was the start to a long lasting and still remaining business success  in many countries, mainly in Europe and America, but also in Asia, Middle East and Australia. A professional distribution brought hundreds of so-called "UniCar" systems to many hospitals, libraries  and administration buildings. HSBC headquarters for example in London and Hong Kong operate large Telelift systems with hundreds of transport trolleys.

A second product line was an AGV (automated guided vehicle) called "TransCar" which was installed from 1974 – 2012 in dozens of hospitals in Europe and Asia.

In 1989, Thyssen bought Telelift GmbH, integrated its own library automation system type "MultiLift" and added the Siemens track system type Simacom VT. In 1999, a Swiss company bought Telelift GmbH and integrated it into their healthcare solutions group. In 2012, Telelift GmbH was sold and is privately owned again.
  
To date, more than 1,300 Telelift systems have been installed in over 40 countries.

Products 
Telelift develops and produces rail-bound conveying systems for transporting goods of up to 50kg in buildings and production plants. 

A unique trait of all systems is a three-dimensional traffic routing, with 100% system monitoring and Industry 4.0 qualified implementation.

Healthcare has the largest market share. About 500 systems have been installed in hospitals, to increase hygiene standards and significantly drop the number of lower-educated transportation staff. 

Other markets are libraries with more than 250,000 books, administration buildings with security demand, and industry applications (automotive and food industries).

External links 
Website of Telelift GmbH

References

Engineering companies of Germany
German brands
Logistics companies of Germany
Privately held companies of Germany
Technology companies established in 1964
1964 establishments in West Germany